In obstetrics, position is the orientation of the fetus in the womb, identified by the location of the presenting part of the fetus relative to the pelvis of the mother. Conventionally, it is the position assumed by the fetus before the process of birth, as the fetus assumes various positions and postures during the course of childbirth.

Positions 
Depending upon which part of the fetus is expected to be delivered first (fetal presentation), there are many possible positions:
 Vertex presentation with longitudinal lie:

 Breech presentation with longitudinal lie:  
Left sacrum anterior (LSA)—the buttocks, as against the occiput of the vertex presentation, like close to the vagina (hence known as breech presentation), which lie anteriorly and towards the left.
Right sacrum anterior (RSA)—the buttocks face anteriorly and towards the right.
Left sacrum posterior (LSP)—the buttocks face posteriorly and towards the left.
Right sacrum posterior (RSP)—the buttocks face posteriorly and towards right.
Sacrum anterior (SA)—the buttocks face anteriorly.
Sacrum posterior (SP)—the buttocks face posteriorly.

 Shoulder presentation with transverse lie are classified into four types, based on the location of the scapula (shoulderblade); note: the presentation is significantly different from asynclitic positioning, and in most cases needs to be delivered by cesarean section.
Left scapula-anterior (LSA)
Right scapula-anterior (RSA)
Left scapula-posterior (LSP)
Right scapula-posterior (RSP)

See also 
 Cephalic presentation
 Child birth
 Fetal position
 Fetal relations
 Presentation

Notes

References

External links 
 Normal Labor and Delivery from Management of Labor and Delivery provided by Google books

Presentations and positions in childbirth
Obstetrics
Midwifery